Quezon City Gaz N Go, previously known as the Quezon City Capitals, are a professional basketball team in the Maharlika Pilipinas Basketball League. The team is owned by former First District Representative Onyx Crisologo, with the support of Niño Dionisio and Conrado Gicanal and the Quezon City Government.

History
The Quezon City Capitals and Imus Bandera were the last team to join the inaugural season of the Maharlika Pilipinas Basketball League. The team was represented by City Councilor Onyx Crisologo during the contract signing with the League headed by Commissioner Kenneth Duremdes.

Current roster

Head coaches
 Vis Valencia (2018–2019)
 Christian Coronel (2019–2020)
 Alvin Grey (2022–2023)
 Teng Torcuator (2023–present)

All-time roster

Alwin Alday (2018–present)
Peejay Barua (2018–present)
Mike Angelo Cabangon (2018–present)
Miguel Castellano (2018–present)
Jessie James Collado (2018–present)
Jojo Duncil (2018)
Andrew Estrella (2018–present)
Hesed Gabo (2018–present)
Ruel Kondo (2018–present)
Mon Mabayo (2018–present)
Jeymark Mallari (2018–present)
Reymark Matias (2018–present)
Jeff Morillo (2018–present)
John Nolasco (2018–present)
Christian Mari Palma (2018–present)
Chris Santos (2018–present)
Jomar Santos (2018–present)
Mac Lenster Sevilla (2018–present)
Magi Sison (2018–2020)
John Marco Tayongtong (2018–present)
Philip Torres (2018–present)

Notable players
 Andrew Estrella – first MPBL player to post triple double in a game (11 pts, 10 reb, 10 asst)

Season-by-season records
Records from the 2022–23 MPBL season:

References

2018 establishments in the Philippines
Basketball teams established in 2018
Sports teams in Metro Manila
Maharlika Pilipinas Basketball League teams